Hsieh Su-wei was the defending champion, but lost in the second round to Stefanie Vögele.

Belinda Bencic won the title after Ajla Tomljanović retired in the final at 6–4, 0–0.

Seeds

Draw

Finals

Top half

Bottom half

References
Main Draw

Al Habtoor Tennis Challenge - Singles
Al Habtoor Tennis Challenge
2017 in Emirati tennis